Stenorrhynchos is a genus of flowering plants from the orchid family, Orchidaceae. It is native to Mexico, Central America, the West Indies, and northern South America.

Species
Species currently recognized as of June 2014:

 Stenorrhynchos albidomaculatum  Christenson (2005) - Colombia, Venezuela
 Stenorrhynchos austrocompactum  Christenson (2005) - Peru
 Stenorrhynchos glicensteinii  Christenson (2005) - Veracruz, Chiapas, Costa Rica
 Stenorrhynchos speciosum  (Jacq.) Rich. (1817) from Mexico and the West Indies south to Peru
 Stenorrhynchos vaginatum  (Kunth) Spreng. (1826) - Venezuela, Colombia, Ecuador, Peru

See also
 List of Orchidaceae genera

References

  (1826) Systema Vegetabilium, editio decima sexta 3: 709. 
  (2003) Genera Orchidacearum 3: 267 ff. Oxford University Press.
  2005. Handbuch der Orchideen-Namen. Dictionary of Orchid Names. Dizionario dei nomi delle orchidee. Ulmer, Stuttgart

External links

 
Cranichideae genera